The 2018 Dr McKenna Cup, known for sponsorship reasons as the Bank of Ireland Dr McKenna Cup, was a Gaelic football competition in the province of Ulster for county and university teams. It is normally held at the beginning of the GAA season.

Twelve teams take part – the nine Ulster county teams and three university teams, i.e. St Mary's University College, Belfast, Queen's University Belfast and Ulster University at Jordanstown (UUJ).

The draw took place on Thursday 30 November in the Balmoral Hotel, Belfast  with the fixtures confirmed following a meeting of Comhairle Uladh CCC on Tuesday 5 December 2017. 

After many postponements due to bad winter weather, the tournament ended on 17 February 2018 with Donegal the winners, ending a six-year Tyrone winning streak.

Format
Group Stage

The twelve teams are drawn into three sections of four teams, with each section containing three county teams and one university team. Each team plays the other teams in its section once, earning 2 points for a win and 1 for a draw. A "scoring-average/points-ratio" method is used to determine the ranking of teams who are level on section points (as opposed to "scoring differential").

Knock-out Stage

The winners of the three sections and the best runner-up compete in the semi-finals with the two winners meeting in the final.

Group stage

Section A

Section B

Section C

Ranking of second-placed teams

Knock-out Stage

Semi-finals

Final

References

 
Dr McKenna Cup seasons